Peninsula Pictures is an Indian company that produces television series and entertainment content. The company was founded in the year 2015 by Alind Srivastava and Nissar Parvej and the head office is located in Andheri West, Mumbai.

The company has produced shows for General Entertainment Channels (GECs) like Aladdin - Naam Toh Suna Hoga (Sony SAB), Hero gayab mode on (Sony SAB), Paramavatar Shri Krishna (&TV), Vikram Betaal Ki Rahasya Gatha (&TV), Mayavi Maling (STAR Bharat), Dev (Colors), Dev Season 2 (Colors), Vishkanya (Zee TV) Kahat Hanuman Jai Shree Ram(&tv).

Current productions

Former productions

Award and recognition

References

External links
 Official website

Hindi cinema
Film production companies based in Mumbai
Entertainment companies established in 2015
Mass media companies established in 2015